Syed Mohammed Madni Ashraf often referred to as Shaykh al-Islām, and Madni Miyan (born on 27 August 1938 CE; 1 Rajab 1357 AH) is an Indian Islamic scholar, theologian, spiritual leader and author from Ashrafpur Kichhauchha, Uttar Pradesh, India.
Known for his eloquent speeches, he is an expert of Islamic Philosophy, Islamic Sacred Law and Fiqh (Jurisprudence).

Life
He is the founder of Shaikhul Islam Trust. Syed Madni Miya is a patron of various social, academic and other developmental activities of Sufi Sunni Muslims in India. He has always endorsed the unity between Sufi silsilas in the country. Appreciating the services done by Imam Ahmed Raza Khan R.A., he has told that Markaze-e-Ahle Sunnat Bareilly and Kichhauchha are two eyes of Muslims in India, these can't be separated.

Tafsir-e-Ashrafi
Tafseer-e-Ashrafi is a classical Sunni interpretation (tafsir) of the Qur'an, composed first by Mohaddise Azam E Hind and then completed after his death by his spiritual successor and son Syed Mohammed Madni Ashraf in 2008. It is recognized as one of the most popular exegeses of the Qur'an today due to its simple style and its conciseness.
It is 10 volume in length, which was translated in Urdu and later in English.

Books
Islam Ka Tassawure Ila Aur Maududi Sahib
Deen aur Aqamat e Deen
Al-Arba'in Al-Ashrafi
Baran e Rahmat
Masila Hazir O Nazir
Inam al-Amal bil Niyyat
Karamat-e-Ghawth-e-Azam
Islamic Law
Muslim Personal Law or Islamic Law?
Islam Ka Nazriya Ibadat Aur Maududi Sahib
Dawat e Islami Ka Tanqidi Jaiza
Farizae Dawat O Tabligh
Video Aur TV Ka Shariayi Istamal
Tafhim al-Hadith Sarrah Mhiskat Shareef
Islam Ka Nazriya Khatme Nabuwat Aur Tehzirun Nas
Kanz al-Iman Aur Digar Tarazum-e-Quran Ka Taqably Mutalia
Asri Takaze
Kitabatun Biswa
Karamat-e-Ghawth-e-Azam
Mohabbate Rasool Ruhe Iman
Rasool-e-Akram Kai Tashreehi Iktiyarat
Islam Ka Nazriya Ibadat
Khutbate Hyderabad
Khutbate Bartannia
Muhabbat al-Ahl al-Bayt ( In English:- Love of the Prophet Muhammad's Family)
Roohani Namaaz
Sharhe Hadeese Jibrael
Tafheem al-Hadees
Tafseer e Ashrafi

See also
 Hashmi Miya

References

External links
 Shaikhul Islam Trust
Mohaddise Azam Mission

Shaykh al-Islāms
Indian muftis
Indian Sufis
Sunni imams
Hanafi fiqh scholars
Indian Sunni Muslim scholars of Islam
Muslim reformers
Scholars from Uttar Pradesh
Indian Sunni Muslims
Indian Sufi saints
People from Ambedkar Nagar district
1938 births
Living people
Sufi poets
Sufi mystics
Sufi teachers
Hadith scholars
20th-century Muslim theologians
Chishti Order
Sufi writers
World Islamic Mission
Hanafis
Islamic philosophers
20th-century Indian poets